The 1919 Wisconsin Badgers football team was an American football team that represented the University of Wisconsin in the 1919 Big Ten Conference football season. The team compiled a 5–2 record (3–2 against conference opponents), finished in a tie for fourth place in the Big Ten Conference, and outscored all opponents by a combined total of 91 to 41. John R. Richards was in his third year as Wisconsin's head coach.

Center Charles Carpenter was the team captain. Carpenter was also a consensus first-team selection for the 1919 College Football All-America Team.

End Paul Meyers was selected as an All-American by Walter Eckersall. Meyers had an 80-yard touchdown reception, on a pass from Wally Barr, in a game against Minnesota on November 1, 1919. The play held the Wisconsin record for longest pass and reception for 63 years.

Three Wisconsin players received first-team All-Big Ten honors: Charles Carpenter, Paul Meyers, and end Frank Weston.

Schedule

References

Wisconsin
Wisconsin Badgers football seasons
Wisconsin Badgers football